The Girl Guides Association of Papua New Guinea is the Guiding organisation in Papua New Guinea. Founded in 1927, the girls-only organization became a full member of the World Association of Girl Guides and Girl Scouts in 1978. It has 1,224 members (as of 2008).

The Girl Guide emblem incorporates elements of the flag of Papua New Guinea.

Sources

See also
The Scout Association of Papua New Guinea

External links
 WAGGGS information on Papua New Guinea

Scouting and Guiding in Papua New Guinea
World Association of Girl Guides and Girl Scouts member organizations
Youth organizations established in 1927